Me and Marlborough is a 1935 British comedy film, directed by Victor Saville, and starring Cicely Courtneidge, Tom Walls, Barry MacKay, Peter Gawthorne, Henry Oscar and Cecil Parker.

Plot
Sergeant Cummings searches Kit Ross's pub for a deserter drummer boy. When he finds the lad, Kit leads the pub patrons in attacking the sergeant's men, and the young man gets away, for which she is put in stocks. While there, she plans her impending wedding to Dick Welch. However, Cummings gets his revenge. On the night of the wedding, he tricks Dick into taking a shilling, which means he has enlisted in the army. She watches as a ship takes him to the fighting. Undaunted, she disguises herself as a man named Simon and joins up with the Duke of Marlborough's army in Flanders to find her missing husband.

Cast

Reception
Writing for The Spectator, Graham Greene criticized the theatrical qualities of Courtneidge's performance, claiming that "I found myself too embarrassed by Miss Courtneidge's facial contortions to appreciate their share. Miss Courtneidge is used to throwing her effects to the back row of a theatre gallery, and the camera is not kind to her exaggerations".

References

1935 films
1930s historical comedy films
British black-and-white films
British historical comedy films
Films directed by Victor Saville
Films produced by Michael Balcon
Films set in the 18th century
Films set in England
Films set in France
Films scored by Jack Beaver
1935 comedy films
1930s English-language films
1930s British films